This is a list of Polish noble families with the title of Baron.

Families

Abbreviations explanation

See also

 List of szlachta
 List of Polish titled nobility
 Magnates of Poland and Lithuania

Bibliography
 Szymon Konarski, Armorial de la noblesse titrèe polonaise, Paris 1958, s. 365-399.
 Tomasz Lenczewski, Genealogie rodów utytułowanych w Polsce, t. I, Warszawa 1997.
 Der Adel von Galizien, Lodomerien und der Bukowina. J. Siebmacher's großes Wappenbuch, Band 32, Nürnberg 1905, s. 101-111.